Club Balonmano Femenino Málaga Costa del Sol, also known as Costa del Sol Málaga for sponsorship reasons, (former Rincón Fertilidad Málaga), is a women's handball club from Málaga in Spain. Costa del Sol Málaga competes in the División de Honor, the top tier in the Spanish league system.

Season to season

Trophies
 EHF European Cup: 1
2021
 Copa de la Reina: 2
2020, 2022
 Supercopa de España: 1
2021

Team

Current squad 
Squad for the 2022–23 season:

Goalkepeers
 38  Mercedes Castellanos
 68  Virginia Fernádez
Wingers
RW
 11  Sara Bravo 
 27  Isabelle dos Santos Medeiros
LW 
 10  Soledad López
 22  Laura Sánchez Cano
Line Players 
 17  Rocío Campigli
 19  Almudena Gutierez Mora
 88  Paula García Ávila

Back players
 6  Estela Doiro
 9  Silvia Arderius
 13  Elena Cuadrado Sánchez
 18  María Pérez Martín
 20  Esperanza López Jiménez
 57  Rocío Rojas

Transfers 
For the 2023-24 season:

 Joining

 Leaving

Notable players 

  Nuria Benzal
  Paula García Ávila
  Jennifer Gutiérrez Bermejo
  Elke Karsten
  Noelia Oncina
  Paula Valdivia Monserrat
  Soledad López
  Mercedes Castellanos
  Silvia Arderius

References

External links
 Official website

Spanish handball clubs
Sports teams in Andalusia
Handball clubs established in 1994
1994 establishments in Spain
Sport in Málaga